Parliamentary elections were held in Iceland on 20 April 1991. The Independence Party remained the largest party in the Lower House of the Althing, winning 17 of the 42 seats.

Results

Aftermath
Following constitutional changes made in 1991, the Upper and Lower Houses of the Althing were abolished, and all members became part of a unicameral parliament.

References

Iceland
President
Parliamentary elections in Iceland
Iceland